Andrew Patrick Ralston is an American actor raised in Scottsdale, Arizona and Overland Park, Kansas.  He is known for playing Tom Bogan/Brett Houston in the Gordy's Home sequence of Jordan Peele's Nope and Jim McNeile in the TV adaptation of Lethal Weapon. He was also Dr. Saul Faerstein on The People v. O. J. Simpson: American Crime Story, Chip Baggins on Life in Pieces and Sherpa Allen on Crazy Ex-Girlfriend. He has also starred in over 50 national commercials.

Television

Film

References

Living people
21st-century American male actors
Year of birth missing (living people)
American male film actors
American male television actors
People from Maryville, Missouri
Male actors from Missouri